In Defiance of Existence is the fifth studio album by Norwegian black metal band Old Man's Child, released on 20 January 2003.

Track listing 
All music and lyrics written and composed by Galder, except on tracks 4 & 7 music by Galder/Jardar.
 "Felonies of the Christian Art" – 5:48
 "Agony of Fallen Grace" – 4:28
 "Black Seeds on Virgin Soil" – 4:57
 "In Defiance of Existence" – 4:56
 "Sacrifice of Vengeance" – 4:31
 "The Soul Receiver" – 4:31
 "In Quest of Enigmatic Dreams" – 0:52
 "The Underworld Domains" – 4:48
 "Life Deprived" – 4:49

Personnel
Galder – Vocals, Guitars, Bass and Synth
Jardar – Guitars
Nicholas Barker - Drums
Gus G – Guest guitar solos on tracks 1 and 9

Additional personnel
 Christophe Szpajdel — logo

References

2003 albums
Old Man's Child albums
Century Media Records albums
Albums produced by Fredrik Nordström